Joseph Edward Dunn (March 11, 1885 – March 19, 1944) was a professional baseball player who played catcher for the Brooklyn Superbas during the 1908 & 1909 baseball seasons.

He became a minor league baseball manager after his playing career ended, winning league championships in 1919, 1920 and 1930.

Minor league managing career
Dallas Giants (1915)
Springfield Reapers (1916–1917)
Bloomington Bloomers (1919–1921)
Denver Bears (1922)
Birmingham Barons (1922)
Evansville Little Evas (1924)
Evansville Pocketeers (1925)
Elmira Colonels (1926–1927)
Springfield Buckeyes (1928)
Springfield Dunnmen (1929)
Springfield Blue Sox (1930)
Bloomington Cubs (1931)

External links

1885 births
1944 deaths
Major League Baseball catchers
Birmingham Barons managers
Brooklyn Superbas players
Baseball players from Ohio
Sportspeople from Springfield, Ohio
Columbia Gamecocks players
Roanoke Tigers players
Evansville River Rats players
Mobile Sea Gulls players
Atlanta Crackers players
Dallas Giants players
Springfield Reapers players
Salt Lake City Bees players
Bloomington Bloomers players
Evansville Little Evas players
Elmira Colonels players